"All or Nothing" is a 1994 song by American R&B singer Joe. It was written by Joe, Denvil Tracey Gerrell, and Keith Miller for his debut studio album, Everything (1993), while production was helmed by Joe, featuring co-production from Miller. Released as the album's third and single from, it reached number 100 on the Billboard Hot 100 and number 33 on the Hot R&B/Hip-Hop Songs chart, while peaking at number 56 on the UK Singles Chart.

Track listings

Credits and personnel
 Denvil Tracey Gerrell – writer
 Keith Miller – producer, writer
 Adam Hudzim – mixing
 Joe Thomas – producer, vocals, writer

Charts

References

Joe (singer) songs
1994 singles
1993 songs
PolyGram singles